Joseph Olatunji Ajayi was elected Senator for the Ekiti North constituency of Ekiti State, Nigeria at the start of the Nigerian Fourth Republic, running on the Alliance for Democracy (AD) platform. He took office on 29 May 1999.
 
After taking his seat in the Senate he was appointed Chairman of the committee on Tourism & Culture and a member of the committees on Ethics, Internal Affairs and Information.

References

Members of the Senate (Nigeria)
Living people
People from Ekiti State
Alliance for Democracy (Nigeria) politicians
Yoruba politicians
20th-century Nigerian politicians
21st-century Nigerian politicians
Year of birth missing (living people)